Nicholas D'Agostino may refer to:

 Nicholas D'Agostino Sr. (1910–1996), American supermarket magnate
 Nicholas D'Agostino (motivational speaker) (born 1989), American motivational speaker
 Nicholas D'Agostino (soccer) (born 1998), Australian soccer player

See also
 Nicolás D'Agostino (born 1982), Argentine actor